Major-General Sir Thomas Townsend Pears KCB (9 May 1809 – 17 January 1892) was a senior British Indian Army officer who went on to be Military Secretary to the India Office.

Military career
Educated at Addiscombe Military Seminary, Pears was commissioned into the Madras Engineers in 1825.

In 1836 he was appointed Commanding Officer of the Madras Sappers and Miners and in that capacity went on to be Chief Engineer for the expedition to Karnal in India in 1839 and for the capture of Chusan in China in 1840.

In 1841 he was appointed Commanding Engineer of the Army in China and took a leading role in the capture of Ting-hai.

Returning to India he became consulting engineer for the railways in Madras. He became Military Secretary to the India Office in 1861 and found himself having to deal with the financial burden created by the fact that one quarter of all Indian Army officers were actually located and receiving a pension in England rather than India. He was appointed KCB in 1871 and retired in 1877.

Family
In 1840 he married Bellina Marianne Johnstone and they went on to have seven children.

References

Further reading

 

1809 births
1892 deaths
Graduates of Addiscombe Military Seminary
British Indian Army generals
Knights Commander of the Order of the Bath
British military personnel of the First Opium War